Jeb F. Willenbring is a Full Professor and Associate Chair for Graduate Mathematics at the University of Wisconsin-Milwaukee. Most of his research falls within the categories of Representation Theory, Discrete Mathematics, and Mathematical Physics. His current research consists of several collaborations concerning algebraic combinatorics and various aspects of Representation Theory. Willenbring has published multiple papers concerning the nature of Littlewood-Richardson coefficients, a particular focus of his, in collaboration with Professors Pamela Harris, Mark Colorusso, and William Erickson.

Education/Academic Career 
Willenbring attended North Dakota State University during his undergraduate years and graduated with a bachelor's degree in 1995. After graduating, he went on to pursue a PhD degree in mathematics from the University of California, San Diego. He worked with his doctoral advisor, Nolan Russell Wallach, to produce his thesis Stability Properties for q-Mulitplicities and Branching Formulas for Representations of the Classical Groups.

After receiving his PhD in mathematics in 2000, he accepted an Assistant Professor position at the University of Wisconsin-Milwaukee in 2003. He was promoted to an Associate Professor position in 2008 and to a Full Professor position in 2013. During his time at the University of Wisconsin-Milwaukee, Willenbring has taught numerous classes including Advanced Calculus, Number Theory, and Graduate Algebra and supervised 9 Graduate Student theses to the point of completion. As legally blind professor, he is a particularly zealous advocate for students with disabilities. As a member of his university's ADA advisory committee, Willenbring successfully advocated to bring an app for visually impaired student to campus, making UWM the first university in its state to offer a free app for the blind and visually impaired.

Publications 
Notable publications by Jeb Willenbring include:

Awards 
Willenbring has received numerous awards and grants. After graduating from his PhD Program, he taught at Yale University from 2000–2003 and was granted NSF VIGRE funding. In 2013, Willenbring was named as a fellow of the American Mathematics Society as part of its inaugural class of fellows. Recognizing his work towards increasing campus accessibility, Willenbring also received a UWM Accessibility Resource Center Excellence Award in 2016.

References 

University of Wisconsin–Milwaukee faculty
North Dakota State University alumni
University of San Diego alumni
American mathematicians
Year of birth missing (living people)
Living people